Polypterus weeksii, the mottled bichir, is a fish in the family Polypteridae found in the central basin of the Congo River.  It grows to about 54 cm in head-to-tail length.

Named in honor of John Henry Weeks (1861-1924), Baptist missionary, ethnographer, explorer and diarist, who collected type at his mission station in Monsembe, upper Congo River, Zaire (now Democratic Republic of the Congo).

References

Polypteridae
Taxa named by George Albert Boulenger
Fish described in 1898